The 22921 / 22922 Bandra Terminus–Gorakhpur Antyodaya Express is an Express train belonging to Western Railway zone that runs between Bandra Terminus and  . It is being operated with 22921/22922 train numbers on a weekly basis.

Coach composition 
The trains is completely general coaches trains designed by Indian Railways with features of LED screen display to show information about stations, train speed etc. Vending machines for water. Bio toilets in compartments as well as CCTV cameras and mobile charging points and toilet occupancy indicators.

Service

22921/Bandra Terminus–Gorakhpur Antyodaya Express has an average speed of 56 km/hr and covers 2026 km in 36 hrs 25 mins.
22922/Gorakhpur–Bandra Terminus Antyodaya Express has an average speed of 55 km/hr and covers 2026 km in 36 hrs 50 mins.

Route & halts

 Bandra Terminus
 
 
 
 
 
 
 
 
 
 
 
 
 
 
 
 
 
 
 Gorakhpur Junction

Schedule

Traction 
Both trains are hauled by a Vadodara Loco Shed-based WAP-7 electric locomotives from Bandra to Ratlam. From Ratlam, trains are hauled by a Ratlam Loco Shed-based WDM-3A / WDM-3D diesel locomotive until Gorakhpur and vice versa.

Direction reversal

Train reverses its direction one time:

See also 
 Antyodaya Express
 Bandra Terminus
 Gorakhpur Junction railway station

Notes

References

External links
 22921/Bandra Terminus – Gorakhpur Antyodaya Express India Rail Info
 22922/Gorakhpur – Bandra Terminus Antyodaya Express India Rail Info

Antyodaya Express trains
Rail transport in Maharashtra
Rail transport in Gujarat
Rail transport in Madhya Pradesh
Rail transport in Rajasthan
Transport in Mumbai
Passenger trains originating from Gorakhpur
Railway services introduced in 2017